The 1906 Bolshevik raid on the Tsarevich Giorgi took place on September 20, 1906 (Julian calendar) when Tsarevich Giorgi, 2,200 ton steamship measuring 285 feet led by captain Sinkevich, was travelling from Odessa to Batum carrying vast amounts of money. The ship stopped off at Novorossiysk, Sukhum and New Athos for wage deliveries. Twenty-five Bolshevik gunmen led by Joseph Stalin slipped aboard armed with Mausers and grenades. At 1:15 am they and four renegade sailors took over the ship.

Stalin said: "We're revolutionaries through and through, not criminals. We need cash for the Revolution and we'll take only Treasury funds. Obey my commands and ther'll be no bloodshed. But if you're thinking of resisting, we'll kill you all and blow up the ship."

They stole at least 16,000 roubles, Stalin left each sailor a 10 rouble tip for not resisting. The officers were held hostage in a lifeboat till all the cash was delivered, the sailors then rowed the Bolsheviks ashore. 
The alarm was not raised for seven hours, none of them were caught.

References 

Joseph Stalin
Bolshevik finance
1906 crimes in the Russian Empire
Robberies in Russia
Crime in Russia